Robert James Joseph Woolley (born 6 August 1990) is an English former first-class cricketer.

In 2020, Robert captained Chipstead to the Surrey Championship Group 5 Certificate against an angry Leatherhead attack in 2020. He captained Chipstead for 5 years, winning promotion in his 3rd season in charge. Robert played for Hyde Cricket Club throughout his junior and early senior career and won two Cheshire Cups. He was part of the famous run to the T20 finals day on Sky Sports also, scoring the winning runs against Kendal to win the game to win the quarter final. He played a key role throughout the 2011 season taking two 8 wicket hauls against Neston and hitting 140 against East Brierly most notably.

Woolley was born at Tameside hospital and was educated at St Bede's College, Manchester, before going down to Anglia Ruskin University in Cambridge. In 2009, Woolley played minor counties cricket for Cheshire, making once appearance each in the Minor Counties Championship and the MCCA Knockout Trophy. While studying at Anglia Ruskin, Woolley made his debut in first-class cricket for Cambridge UCCE against Yorkshire at Fenner's in 2009. He played first-class cricket for Cambridge MCCU until 2012, making eleven appearances. Playing as an all-rounder, Woolley scored a total of 284 runs at an average of 31.55 across his eleven matches, with a high score of 89 not out. He took 22 wickets with his right-arm medium pace bowling, at a bowling average of 53.27, with best figures of 3 for 54.

In 2012, Woolley was called up to the Unicorns squad for the 2012 Clydesdale Bank 40, making his List A one-day debut in the tournament against Derbyshire at Chesterfield. He made six further List A appearance for the Unicorns, the last of which came in the 2013 Yorkshire Bank 40. He scored 61 runs across his seven one-day matches, With his fast-medium pace and controlled swing, his best day was against Yorkshire at Headingly. He took the 2 early wickets of ex-Australian opener Phil Jaques and Yorkshire captain Andrew Gale during a fine spell of 2-25 off 8 overs. He also scored 28 not out in the first innings. He played minor counties cricket for Cambridgeshire in 2015 and 2016, making one appearance in the Minor Counties Championship and five appearances in the MCCA Knockout Trophy.

Notes and references

External links

1990 births
Living people
People from Tameside (district)
People educated at St Bede's College, Manchester
Alumni of Anglia Ruskin University
English cricketers
Cheshire cricketers
Cambridge MCCU cricketers
Unicorns cricketers
Cambridgeshire cricketers